Join the Flumeride is a 1998 Swedish mockumentary.  The plot revolves around two fictional bands, "Gula Tidningen" and "Pincette", which are parodies of Swedish pop groups Gyllene Tider and Roxette respectively.  The film features a cameo by Per Gessle, the lead vocalist of Gyllene Tider and one half of the duo Roxette.   The title is a takeoff on the lyrics of Roxette's hit 1991 single, Joyride.

External links

1998 films
Swedish comedy films
1990s mockumentary films
1990s Swedish films